I'm a Big Shot Now is a 1936 Warner Bros. Merrie Melodies cartoon directed by Friz Freleng. The short was released on April 11, 1936.

Plot
The plot concerns a street and 
unnamed gangster bird, who sings the title song and likes to prove his toughness by beating up on the police without the slightest provocation. The hoodlum spots the Birdville Bank across the street from the saloon where he hangs out, and calls his gang together to rob the bank and make a quick getaway. In the ensuing chase, the avian police (including the one who screams a Tarzan yell) capture him by shooting the floor out from the birdhouse which he uses as his hideout, leaving him to sing "I'm Just a Jailbird Now" from his jail cell.

Notes
This marked the final Warner Bros. cartoon short with music scored by Bernard Brown.
This cartoon was re-released issued into the Blue Ribbon Merrie Melodies program on August 4, 1945.

References

External links

I'm a Big Shot Now

1936 films
1936 animated films
1936 comedy films
American black-and-white films
Animated films about birds
Films scored by Bernard B. Brown
Films scored by Norman Spencer (composer)
Short films directed by Friz Freleng
Merrie Melodies short films
Warner Bros. Cartoons animated short films
1930s Warner Bros. animated short films
1930s English-language films